was a Japanese actor who appeared in over 200 films between 1934 and 1981. He appeared in 21 of Akira Kurosawa's 30 films (more than any other actor), including as a lead actor in Drunken Angel (1948), Rashomon (1950), Ikiru (1952) and Seven Samurai (1954). He played Professor Kyohei Yamane in Ishirō Honda's original Godzilla (1954). For his contributions to the arts, the Japanese government decorated Shimura with the Medal with Purple Ribbon in 1974 and the Order of the Rising Sun, 4th Class, Gold Rays with Rosette in 1980.

Early life
Shimura was born  in Ikuno, Hyōgo Prefecture, Japan. His forebears were members of the samurai class: in 1868 his grandfather took part in the Battle of Toba–Fushimi during the Boshin War. Shimura entered Ikuno Primary School in 1911 and Kobe First Middle School in 1917. He missed two years of schooling because of a mild case of tuberculosis, and subsequently moved to the prefectural middle school in Nobeoka, Miyazaki Prefecture, where his father had been transferred by his employer, Mitsubishi Mining. At Nobeoka Middle School, he excelled in English and became active on the literary society's magazine, to which he contributed poetry. He also became a star of the rowing club. In 1923, he entered Kansai University, but after his father's retirement the family could no longer afford the fees for a full-time course and he switched to the part-time evening course in English literature, supporting himself by working at the Osaka municipal waterworks. Among the teachers in the English Literature Department were the playwright Toyo-oka Sa-ichirō (豊岡佐一郎) and the Shakespeare scholar Tsubouchi Shikō (坪内士行). These two inspired in Shimura an enthusiasm for drama. He joined the University's Theatre Studies Society and in 1928 formed an amateur theatrical group, the Shichigatsu-za (七月座) with Toyo-oka as director. He began to miss work because of the time he spent on theatrical activities and eventually lost his job. He then left university to try to earn a living in the theatre. The Shichigatsu-za turned professional and began to tour, but got into financial difficulties and folded.

Career
After the failure of the Shichigatsu-za, Shimura went back to Osaka, where he began to get roles in radio plays. In 1930 he joined the Kindaiza (近代座) theatre company and became a fully professional actor. He toured China and Japan with the Kindaiza, but in 1932 he left the company and returned again to Osaka, where he appeared with the Shinseigeki (新声劇) and Shinsenza (新選座) troupes. Talking pictures were just then coming in and Shimura realised they would provide opportunities for stage-trained actors. In 1932 he joined the Kyoto studios of the film production company Shinkō Kinema. He made his film debut in the 1934 silent Ren'ai-gai itchōme (恋愛街一丁目: Number One, Love Street). The first film in which he had a speaking part was the 1935 Chūji uridasu (忠次売出す), directed by Mansaku Itami. His first substantial film role was as a detective in Mizoguchi Kenji's 1936 Osaka Elegy (Naniwa erejii; 浪華悲歌).
 

The film which established his reputation as a first-rate actor was Itami Mansaku's 1936 Akanishi Kakita (赤西蠣太: Capricious Young Man). In 1937 he moved to Nikkatsu film corporation's Kyoto studios, and between then and 1942 appeared in nearly 100 films. His most notable role in these years was that of Keishirō in the long-running series Umon Torimono-chō (右門捕物帖), starring Kanjūrō Arashi. He also demonstrated his considerable ability as a singer in the 1939 "cine-operetta", Singing Lovebirds. During this time the political regime in Japan was growing ever more oppressive, and Shimura was arrested by the Special Higher Police (Tokubetsu Kōtō Keisatsu, known as Tokkō) and held for about three weeks because of his earlier association with left-wing theatre groups. He was eventually released on the recognisance of his wife Masako and fellow-actor Ryūnosuke Tsukigata. He is said to have made use of this experience later when playing a Tokkō official in Akira Kurosawa's 1946 No Regrets for Our Youth. When Nikkatsu and Daiei merged in 1942, Shimura moved to the Kōa Eiga studios and then in 1943 to Tōhō. A few weeks before the end of the Pacific War in August 1945, Shimura's elder brother was killed in Southeast Asia.

In 1943, Shimura appeared as the old jujutsu teacher Murai Hansuke, a character based in the historical Hansuke Nakamura, in Kurosawa's debut movie, Sanshiro Sugata. Along with Toshirō Mifune, Shimura is the actor most closely associated with Kurosawa: he eventually appeared in 21 of Kurosawa's 30 films. In fact, Kurosawa's cinematic collaboration with Shimura, from Sanshiro Sugata in 1943 to Kagemusha in 1980, started earlier and lasted longer than his work with Mifune (1948–65). Shimura's performances for Kurosawa included the doctor in Drunken Angel (1948), the veteran detective in Stray Dog (1949), the flawed lawyer in Scandal (1950), the woodcutter in Rashomon (1950), the mortally ill bureaucrat in Ikiru (1952), and the lead samurai Kambei in Seven Samurai (1954). Kurosawa wrote the part in Kagemusha specifically for Shimura, but the scenes were cut from the Western release, so many in the West did not know that he had been in the film. The DVD release of the film by The Criterion Collection restored Shimura's footage.

Shimura appeared in a number of Tōhō kaiju (giant monster) and tokusatsu (special effects) films, many of which were directed by Kurosawa's good friend and colleague Ishirō Honda. Shimura's roles included Professor Kyohei Yamane in the original Godzilla (1954), a character he briefly reprised in Godzilla Raids Again (1955).

Death
Shimura died on February 11, 1982, in Tokyo, Japan, from emphysema at the age of 76. His effects were presented to the Film Centre of the National Museum of Modern Art, Tokyo.

Filmography

Number One, Love Street (1934) as Osachi's father
Umon torimonochō: Harebare gojûsantsugi - Ranma hen (1935) as Santa
Umon torimonochō: Harebare gojûsantsugi (1935)
Chûji uridasu (1935)
Umon torimonochō: Harebare gojûsantsugi - Saiketsu hen (1936)
Osaka Elegy (1936) as Inspector
Shura hakkō: Dai-san-pen (1936)
Chûretsu nikudan sanyûshi (1936)
Akanishi Kakita (1936) as Taranoshin Tsunomata
Seishun gonin otoko: Zempen (1937)
Seishun gonin otoko: Kōhen (1937)
Taki no shiraito (1937)
Mitokomon kaikokuki (1937)
Jiraiya (1937) as Gundayū Yao
Chikemuri Takadanobaba (1937) as Takusan
The Skull Coin (1938)
Kurama Tengu (1938) as Kichinosuke Saigō
Shamisen yakuza (1938) as Heisuke
Yami no kagebōshi (1938)
Jigoku no mushi (1938)
Akagaki Genzō (1938) as Jōzaemon Sakaya
Yajikita dōchūki (1938)
Shusse taikoki (1938)
Mazō (1938)
Zoku mazō - Ibara Ukon (1939)
Edo no akutarō (1939)
Singing Lovebirds (1939) as Kyōsai Shimura
Tsubanari ronin (1939) as Sherikov
Shunjū ittōryū (1939) as Jūbei Tamon
Miyamoto Musashi: Dai-san-bu - Kenshin ichiro (1940)
Zoku Shimizu minato (1940)
Phantom Castle (1940)
Oda Nobunaga (1940)
Umi wo wataru sairei (1941)
Sugata naki fukushū (1941)
Edo saigo no hi (1941)
Miyamoto Musashi: Ichijoji ketto (1942)
Hahakogusa (1942)
Sanshiro Sugata (1943, Kurosawa) as Hansuke Murai
Himetaru kakugo (1943) as Ryōkichi Ishikawa
Kaigun (1943)
Haha no kinembi (1943)
Kato hayabusa sento-tai (1944)
The Most Beautiful aka Most Beautifully (1944, Kurosawa) as Chief Goro Ishida
Shibaidō (1944)
San-jaku sagohei (1944) as Yasukichi Ito
Nichijō no tatakai (1944)
Tokkan ekichō (1945)
Ai to chikai (1945) as Murai's father, principle
Kita no san-nin (1945) as Masaki
Koi no fuunjii (1945) as Lieutenant Okamoto
The Men Who Tread on the Tiger's Tail (1945, Kurosawa) as Kataoka
Minshū no Teki (1946)
Those Who Make Tomorrow (1946) as Theatre manager
Juichinin no jogakusei (1946)
No Regrets for Our Youth (1946, Kurosawa) as Police Commissioner 'Poison Strawberry' Dokuichigo
Aru yo no Tonosama (1946)
Four Love Stories (1947) as Masao's father (part 1)
Twenty Four Hours of a Secret Life (1947)
Snow Trail (1947) as Nojiro
Haru no mezame (1947) as Kenzō Ogura
A Second Life (1948) as Union leader
Drunken Angel (1948, Kurosawa) as Doctor Sanada
Life of a Woman (1949) as Murata
The Quiet Duel (1949, Kurosawa) as Dr. Konosuke Fujisaki
Lady from Hell (1949) as Chief of Police
Mori no Ishimatsu (1949)
Stray Dog (1949, Kurosawa) as Detective Sato. Won Best Actor award at 1950 Mainichi Film Concours.
Onna koroshi abura jigoku (1949)
Ore wa yojinbo (1950)
Ma no ogon (1950)
Shunsetsu (1950)
Boryōku no Machi (1950)
Scandal (1950, Kurosawa) as Attorney Hiruta
Ikari no machi (1950) as Kimiko's father
Rashomon (1950, Kurosawa) as Kikori, the wood cutter
Yoru no hibotan (1950)
Tenya wanya (1950)
Ginza Sanshiro (1950)
Datsugoku (1950)
Ai to nikushimi no kanata e (1951)
Elegy (1951)
The Idiot (1951, Kurosawa) as Ono, Ayako's father
Kedamono no yado (1951)
Aoi shinju (1951)
Mesu inu (1951) as Horie
Hopu-san: sarariiman no maki (1951)
The Life of a Horsetrader (1951) as Rokutaro Kosaka
Nusumareta koi (1951)
Vendetta for a Samurai (1952) as Jinzaemon Kawai
The Skin of the South (1952)
Muteki (1952)
The Life of Oharu (1952) as Old Man
Sengoku burai (1952)
Bijo to touzoku (1952) as Yoshimichi
Ikiru (1952, Kurosawa) as Kanji Watanabe
Oka wa hanazakari (1952) as Kenkichi Kimura
Minato e kita otoko (1952) as Okabe
Fuun senryobune (1952)
Hoyo (1953) as Watanabe, alias Nabesan
Tobō chitai (1953)
Yoru no owari (1953) as Yoshikawa
Taiheiyō no washi (1953) as Colonel A, staff officer of the army
Seven Samurai (1954, Kurosawa) as Kambei Shimada
Jirochō sangokushi: kaitō-ichi no abarenbō (1954)
Asakusa no yoru (1954) as Komazo
Kimi shinitamo koto nakare (1954)
Haha no hatsukoi (1954)
Shin kurama tengu daiichi wa: Tengu shutsugen (1954)
Godzilla (1954) as Dr. Kyohei Yamane
Shin kurama tengu daini wa: Azuma-dera no ketto (1954)
Bazoku geisha (1954) as Kotaro Yamabe
Mekura neko (1955)
Godzilla Raids Again (1955) as Dr. Kyohei Yamane
Mugibue (1955) as Nobuo's father
No Time for Tears (1955) as Tatsurō Shimamura
Sanjusan go sha otonashi (1955)
Shin kurama tengu daisanbu (1955)
Muttsuri Umon torimonocho (1955)
Geisha Konatsu: Hitori neru yo no Konatsu (1955) as Sakuma
Sugata naki mokugekisha (1955) as Insepctor Kasai
Asagiri (1955)
I Live in Fear aka Record of a Living Being (1955, Kurosawa) as Dr. Harada
Samurai III: Duel at Ganryu Island (1956) as Sado Nagaoka the court official
Shin, Heike monogatari: Yoshinaka o meguru sannin no onna (1956) as Sanemori Saito
Wakai ki (1956) as Hanako's Father
Kyatsu o nigasuna (1956) as Nagasawa
The Underworld (1956) as Tsunejiro Furuya
Godzilla, King of the Monsters (1956) as Dr. Yamane
Narazu-mono (1956) as Juzo
Tōkyō hanzai chizu (1956)
Bōkyaku no hanabira (1957)
Throne of Blood (1957, Kurosawa) as Noriyasu Odagura
Yama to kawa no aru machi (1957)
Kono futari ni sachi are (1957)
Sanjūrokunin no jōkyaku (1957) as Yamagami - Detective
Arakure (1957)
Bōkyaku no hanabira: Kanketsuhen (1957)
Kiken na eiyu (1957)
Yuunagi (1957) as Yasunori Igawa
Aoi sanmyaku Shinko no maki (1957)
Zoku Aoi sanmyaku Shinko no maki (1957)
Dotanba (1957)
The Mysterians (1957) as Dr. Tanjiro Adachi
Ohtori-jo no hanayome (1958)
Edokko matsuri (1958) as Hōkinokami Aoyama
The Loyal 47 Ronin (Chūshingura) (1958) as Jūbei Ōtake
Seven from Edo (1958) as Sagamiya
Haha (1958) as Ijūin
Uguisu-jō no hanayome (1958)
Ten to sen (1958) as Kasai
Jinsei gekijō - Seishun hen (1958)
The Hidden Fortress (1958, Kurosawa) as The Old General, Izumi Nagakura
Nichiren to Mōko Daishūrai (1958) as Yasaburō
Ken wa shitte ita (1958)
Sora kakeru hanayome (1959) as Shichibei
Tetsuwan tōshu Inao monogatari (1959) as Kyūsaku Inao
Kotan no kuchibue (1959)
Taiyō ni somuku mono (1959) as Ichikawa - detective
Sengoku gunto-den (1959) as Saemon Toki
Kagero ezu (1959) as Ryoan
The Three Treasures (1959) as Elder Kumaso
Beran me-e geisha (1959)
Shobushi to sono musume (1959)
Kēdamonō no torū michi (1959)
Afraid to Die (1960) as Gohei Hirayama
Storm Over the Pacific (1960) as Tosaku
Yoru no nagare (1960) as Koichiro Sonoda
Man Against Man (1960) as Chotaro Masue
The Bad Sleep Well (1960, Kurosawa) as Administrative Officer Moriyama
Gambare! Bangaku (1960)
Sarariiman Chūshingura (1960) as Honzo Kadokawa
Sen-hime goten (1960) as Sadonokami Honda
The Story of Osaka Castle (1961) as Katagiri
Harekosode (1961)
Zoku sarariiman Chūshingura (1961) as Honzo Kadokawa
Yojimbo (1961, Kurosawa) as Tokuemon - Sake Brewer
Fundoshi isha (1961) as Matsuoemon
Kutsukake Tokijirō (1961) as Hacchōnawate Tokubei
Ai to honoho to (1961) as Yoshii
Mothra (1961) as News Editor
Kuroi gashū dainibu: Kanryū (1961)
Futari no musuko (1961)
Restoration Fire (1961) as Yahei
Sanjuro (1962, Kurosawa) as Kurofuji
Zoku sarariiman shimizu minato (1962)
Long Way to Okinawa (1962)
Gorath (1962) as Kensuke Sonoda - Paleontologist
Kurenai no sora (1962)
Kujira gami (1962)
Chushingura: Hana no Maki, Yuki no Maki (1962) as Hyōbu Chisaka
Attack Squadron! (1963) as Admiral
High and Low (1963, Kurosawa) as Chief of Investigation Section
Boryokudan (1963)
Attack Squadron! (1963)
The Lost World of Sinbad (1963) as King Raksha
Tsukiyo no wataridori (1963) as Nagisa yo yuki jo
Jinsei gekijo: shin hisha kaku (1964)
Chi to daiyamondo (1964)
Brand of Evil (1964) as Tsukamoto, manager
Tensai sagishi monogatari: Tanuki no hanamichi (1964) as Komai
Ghidorah, the Three-Headed Monster (1964) as Dr. Tsukamoto
Kwaidan (1964) as Head priest (segment "Miminashi Hōichi no hanashi")
Matatabi san ning yakuza (1965) as Kakegawa Bunzo
Jigoku no hatobā (1965)
Barā kētsu shobū (1965)
Samurai Assassin (1965) as Narihisa Ichijō
Red Beard (1965, Kurosawa) as Tokubei Izumiya
Sanshiro Sugata (1965) as Mishima
Taiheiyō kiseki no sakusen: Kisuka (1965) as Military Command president
Frankenstein vs. Baragon (1965) as Axis Scientist
Buraikan jingi (1965) as Genkichi Jinnai
Kono koe naki sakebi (1965)
Sarutobi Sasuke (1966) as Hakuunsai Tozawa
Bangkok no yoru (1966) as Dr. Yoshino
Kaerazeru hatoba (1966) as Detective Egusa
Zesshō (1966) as Sōbei Sonoda
Showa saidai no kaoyaku (1966)
Noren ichidai: jōkyō (1966)
Ārappoi no ha gōmen dazē (1967)
Satogashi ga kowareru toki (1967) as Kudo
Japan's Longest Day (1967) as Information Bureau Director Hiroshi Shimomura
Gyangu no teiō (1967)
Naniwa kyokaku: dokyo shichinin giri (1967)
Kyokotsu ichidai (1967)
The Sands of Kurobe (1968) as Ashimura
Botan Dōrō (1968) as Fortune Teller
Zatoichi and the Fugitives (1968) as Dr. Junan
Gion matsuri (1968) as Tsuneemon
Shin Abashiri Bangaichi (1968) as Tetsutarō Fujigami
Sangyo supai (1968)
Onna tobakushi amadera kaichō (1968)
Gendai yakuza: yotamono no okite (1968)
Ah kaiten tokubetsu kogetikai (1968)
Samurai Banners (1969)
Shōwa zankyō-den: Karajishi jingi (1969)
It's Tough Being a Man (1969) as Hyōichirō Suwa
Shin Abashiri Bangaichi: Saihate no Nagare-mono (1969)
Shin Abashiri Bangaichi: Runin-masaki no ketto (1969)
Nihon boryoku-dan: kumicho to shikaku (1969)
The Militarists (1970) as Editor (uncredited)
Yomigaeru daichi (1971) as Gondo
Gorotsuki mushuku (1971)
Tora-san's Love Call (1971) as Hyouichiro Suwa (Hiroshi's father)
Otoko wa tsurai yo: Torajiro renka (1971)
Gokuaku bozu - Nomu utsu kau (1971)
Gokudo makari touru (1972)
Zatoichi's Conspiracy (1973) as Sakubei
 Karei-naru Ichizoku (1974) as Yasuda - Makiko's father
Ranru no hata (1974) as Shihei Furukawa
Prophecies of Nostradamus (1974) as Pediatrician
Karajishi keisatsu (1974)
The Bullet Train (1975) as JNR President
Zoku ningen kakumei (1976)
Ogin-sama (1978, Love and Faith) as Sen Rikyu
Otoko wa tsurai yo: Uwasa no Torajirō (1978) as Hiroshi's Father
Dōran (1980) as Kosuke Miyagi
Tempyō no Iraka (1980)
Kagemusha (1980, Kurosawa) as Gyobu Taguchi
Story of the Japan Philharmonic: Movement of Flame (1981) (final film role)

Television
Akō Rōshi (1964) 
Ten to Chi to (1969), Nagao Fusakage
Haru no Sakamichi (1971), Aoyama Tadatoshi
Daichūshingura (1971), Horiuchi Denzaemon
Akai Unmei (1976)
Ōgon no Hibi (1978), Notoya
Fumō Chitai (1979), Tanigawa

Honours
Medal with Purple Ribbon (1974)
Order of the Rising Sun, 4th Class, Gold Rays with Rosette (1980)

References

Sources

External links

 
 
 

Japanese male film actors
Actors from Hyōgo Prefecture
Deaths from emphysema
1905 births
1982 deaths
20th-century Japanese male actors
Kansai University alumni
Recipients of the Medal with Purple Ribbon
Recipients of the Order of the Rising Sun, 4th class